The Blob is a 1988 American science fiction horror film co-written and directed by Chuck Russell. A remake of the 1958 film of the same name, it stars Shawnee Smith, Kevin Dillon, Donovan Leitch, Jeffrey DeMunn, Paul McCrane, Art LaFleur, Robert Axelrod, Joe Seneca, Del Close and Candy Clark. The plot follows an acidic, amoeba-like organism that crashes down to Earth in a military satellite, which devours and dissolves anything in its path as it grows. It is the third film in The Blob film series.

Filmed in Abbeville, Louisiana, The Blob was theatrically released in August 1988 by Tri-Star Pictures and was a box office failure, grossing $8.2 million against its budget of approximately $10 million. Though it received a mixed response from critics, the film has since accrued a cult following.

Plot

A meteorite crashes near Arborville, California. An elderly vagabond discovers, within the sphere, a massive slime mold-like substance that adheres to his hand. Three high school students, Brian, Meg, and Paul, take him to a hospital. After Brian leaves, Paul witnesses the lower half of the rescued man melting from exposure to the Blob. As he calls for help, the Blob drops on top of him. Meg arrives to see Paul being consumed by the growing Blob. She tries freeing him, but his arm dissolves off. Meg is thrown against a wall and knocked unconscious. The Blob fully dissolves Paul and oozes out of the hospital.

After Brian and Meg have unsatisfactory encounters with the police, they meet at a diner where Meg tells Brian about the Blob. Brian's disbelief is shattered when the diner's handyman George is violently pulled into the sink's drain; killing him. The increasingly large creature pursues them to the diner's walk-in freezer, but it retreats after entering the freezer. After consuming the diner's owner Fran Hewitt and Sheriff Geller, the Blob reenters the sewers. Meg and Brian return to the police station, where the dispatcher tells them Deputy Briggs is near the meteor-landing site. They discover a military operation led by a scientist, Dr. Meddows, who orders the town and the two teens quarantined. While Brian escapes Meg is taken to town, where she learns that her younger brother Kevin had snuck into the movie theater with his friend Eddie. The Blob enters the theater, killing several staff and audience members. Meg arrives as the audience flees the theater, rescuing Eddie and Kevin.

Brian learns the Blob is a biological warfare experiment created during the Cold War; it grew into a mixture of bacteria mutated from outer space radiation. Meddows decides to trap the Blob in the sewers even if that means allowing Meg, Kevin, and Eddie to die. Brian manages to evade military personnel by driving his motorcycle into the sewers when he is found. Meg and Kevin flee from the Blob in the sewers, but Eddie is consumed. Kevin escapes by scaling a pipe to the surface while Meg is saved by Brian. He confronts Meddows in front of the townsfolk and Briggs. Meddows attempts to convince everyone Brian is contaminated and must die. When the plan fails, Meddows tries to shoot Brian, only for his own creation to kill him via oozing into his chemical suit and violently dragging him into the sewer. The military attempts to blow it up with grenades and other explosives. Unfortunately, this only succeeds in enraging the creature as it bursts from the sewers and feasts on the population. Reverend Meeker proclaims the scene to be the prophesied end of the world, after which a failed flamethrower attack sets him ablaze. Meg saves him with a fire extinguisher and also shoots the Blob with it. When the creature backs off, she realizes it cannot tolerate cold.

The survivors retreat to the town hall and hold the Blob off with furniture-barricades and fire extinguishers, but it is a losing battle; it engulfs half the building and devours Briggs. Brian goes to the town's garage and gets a snow maker truck that has canisters of liquid nitrogen attached. As the Blob is about to consume Meg and her family, Brian shoots snow at it. Angered, the Blob turns its attention towards him and knocks the truck over in retaliation; also knocking him unconscious. Meg lures the Blob away from Brian toward the canisters, which she has rigged with an explosive charge taken from a dying soldier. The Blob is about to overrun both Brian and Meg when the charge goes off, blowing up the canisters and covering the Blob in liquid nitrogen, successfully flash-freezing it. Moss Woodley stores the Blob's crystallized remains in the town icehouse.

Later, at a tent-meeting church service in a field, Meeker, disfigured by his burns and driven insane, preaches a doomsday sermon resembling the Blob's attack. One of his congregation asks when the day of reckoning will come. Meeker simply replies: "Soon". He then secretly holds up a glass jar containing a live piece of the Blob, saying: "The Lord will give me a sign".

Cast

 Kevin Dillon as Brian Flagg
 Shawnee Smith as Megan "Meg" Penny
 Donovan Leitch as Paul Taylor
 Jeffrey DeMunn as Sheriff Herb Geller
 Candy Clark as Fran Hewitt
 Joe Seneca as Dr. Christopher Meddows
 Del Close as Reverend Meeker
 Sharon Spelman as Mrs. Margaret Penny
 Beau Billingslea as Moss Woodley
 Art LaFleur as Pharmacist/Tom Penny
 Ricky Paull Goldin as Scott Jeskey
 Paul McCrane as Deputy Bill Briggs
 Michael Kenworthy as Kevin Penny
 Douglas Emerson as Eddie Beckner
 Robert Axelrod as Jennings
 Bill Moseley as The Soldier in the Sewer
 Erika Eleniak as Vicki DeSoto
 Jack Rader as Col. Templeton Hargis
 Jack Nance as Doctor

Analysis
The film functions as a conspiracy theory film. The threat of the original film was an alien entity from outer space. The remake differs in making the threat a biological weapon, created by a secret government agency. The Blob is closely followed by soldiers and scientists in protective suits. The change reflects the mentality of a more cynical era. The sinister government agents are opposed by rebellious teenager Brian Flagg (Kevin Dillon). His depiction as a rebel and a "tough guy punk" includes wearing a leather jacket, sporting long hair, riding a motorcycle, and distrusting authority figures. Del Close, who portrays Reverend Meeker, played an eyepatch wearing hobo in the 1972 movie Beware! The Blob, which was a sequel to the original 1958 film.

Production
Screenwriter Frank Darabont first met director Chuck Russell in 1981, while working as a production assistant on the film Hell Night. Before working together on The Blob, the two also collaborated on the script for A Nightmare on Elm Street 3: Dream Warriors. In 1986 New World Pictures purchased the rights to make a remake of The Blob featuring the original film's director Jack H. Harris as executive producer. A year later the production switched studios to Cinema Group Pictures.

Actor Del Close had been scheduled to direct a "mock opera" about Ronald Reagan at New York's Lincoln Center for the Performing Arts during the filming of The Blob; however, the production was cancelled and he was unexpectedly available to audition for The Blob.

Production began on January 11, with the cast and crew of approximately 150 staying at a Travelodge in Abbeville, Louisiana. Due to the large amount of night shooting, the cast often slept during the day. On their off days, they watched videos at the hotel and ate crawfish, a popular item of local cuisine.

Special effects in the film were handled by Tony Gardner. Gardner was originally supposed to provide only a few small effects, with special effects artist Lyle Conway originally being in charge of the effects. However, after personnel changes he ended up running a crew of 33, including artist Chet Zar and mechanical effects designer Bill Sturgeon. In creating the titular Blob creature, the special effects team used silk bags filled with Methyl cellulose (Fangoria reported Methacil), a thickening agent for food, creating what the team described as a "Blob Quilt". For the few minutes of screen time, near the end of the film, where Reverend Meeker has a scene with fresh burns and another with healed burns, actor Del Close required five-and-a-half hours of makeup preparation for fresh burns, and seven-and-a-half hours for healed burns.

Release
In 1987, the film's rights were acquired by Cinema Group Pictures (later Palisades Entertainment) for a Memorial Day 1988 release, before the original distributor went bankrupt, and Tri-Star Pictures acquired the film's distribution rights.

The Blob opened in New York and Los Angeles, California on August 5, 1988. It grossed $8,247,943 at the box office. An article in the 27 May 1989 Screen International reported that the film’s domestic box-office gross was “disastrous.”

Critical response
On the review aggregator website Rotten Tomatoes, The Blob holds a 63% approval rating based on 27 critic reviews, with an average rating of 6/10. The consensus reads: "The Blob can't replicate the B-movie charms of the original, though its fast pace and gory thrills pack enough of a punch to make it a worthwhile update."

Film critic and historian Leonard Maltin gave the film two out of a possible four stars, noting that "Shawnee Smith screams (and screams) convincingly in this otherwise-needless, if undeniably gooey, remake...Producer Jack Harris updates his own camp classic for the Stephen King generation, but the results are frustratingly mixed". Janet Maslin of The New York Times wrote that the film "is more violent than the original, more spectacular, more cynical, more patently commercial and more attentive to detail", but noted that "for reasons having nothing to do with merit, the 1958 film earned a place in history. The remake, enterprising as it is, won't do the same".

Retrospective reviews have typically been more favorable. Chuck Bowen of Slant Magazine wrote that the film "improves on the original cult classic with inventive, gracefully repulsive special effects and an agreeable post-Watergate anti-authoritarian message". HorrorNews.net gave the film a score of "4 1/2 out of 5", writing that "the twists that this film takes that differ from the original make it all the more terrifying and oddly enough... plausible". TV Guide gave the film 3/5 stars, calling it "a fine, multilayered effort from a director who understands the genre and appreciates its traditions".

Discussing the poor critical and commercial performance of the film in an interview with Starlog, director Chuck Russell stated, "Maybe it was a mistake to do a remake of The Blob with a sense of humor. I thought that would be an entertaining interpretation. … Unfortunately, it was released late in a very hectic summer filled with big films and it didn't have a particularly good ad campaign."

Home media
The film was released on DVD in the United States by Sony Pictures Home Entertainment on September 11, 2001. Sony again released The Blob in September 2013 as part of its "The 4-Movie Horror Unleashed Collection", along with Fright Night, Christine and The Seventh Sign. The film was first released on Blu-ray in the United States by Twilight Time on October 14, 2014. On October 29, 2019, Shout! Factory's "Scream Factory" imprint issued a "Collector's Edition" of the film on Blu-ray, with a multitude of new bonus features.

See also
 The Crazies (1973 film)
 The Thing (1982 film)
 The Stuff (1985 film)

Notes

References

Sources

External links
 
 
 
 
 Retrospective article in Cinefantastique magazine

The Blob (film series)
1988 films
1988 horror films
1980s monster movies
1980s science fiction horror films
1980s American films
Remakes of American films
American monster movies
American science fiction horror films
1980s English-language films
Fictional amorphous creatures
Films about conspiracy theories
Films directed by Chuck Russell
Films set in the 1980s
Films set in 1988
Films set in a movie theatre
Films set in California
Films shot in Louisiana
Horror film remakes
Films scored by Michael Hoenig
Films with screenplays by Frank Darabont
TriStar Pictures films
Films produced by Elliott Kastner
Mad scientist films